George William Grace (8 September 1921 in Corinth, Mississippi – January 17, 2015) was an American linguist who specialized in historical and comparative linguistics, ethnolinguistics, and Austronesian languages, especially the Oceanic languages of Melanesia. He joined the Department of Linguistics at the University of Hawaii at Mānoa in 1964, serving three years as chair (1966–1969) and three decades as editor of Oceanic Linguistics (1962–1991), a journal he founded while teaching anthropology at Southern Illinois University (1960–1964).

Biography
Grace was raised on the Gulf Coast. After service with the United States Army Air Corps (1942–1946), he remained in Europe to earn his first university degree, a licence in political science from the Graduate Institute of International Studies in Geneva in 1948. He then accepted a position as a junior research anthropologist at the University of California, Berkeley, where he did fieldwork in 1951 on the Luiseño language, collaborating with Alfred L. Kroeber on The Sparkman Grammar of Luiseño (University of California Press, 1960). In 1953–1955 he was a research associate for the Tri-Institutional Pacific Program (a consortium of Yale University, the University of Hawaii, and the Bernice P. Bishop Museum in Honolulu) and then for Yale University conducting research in Austronesian linguistics. In 1955–1956 he conducted a survey in the field of many languages in the Solomon Islands, New Caledonia,  Papua New Guinea, and the former Netherlands New Guinea. In 1956–1957 he was an associate in Malayo-Polynesian linguistics at the Bishop Museum.

He completed a Ph.D. dissertation in 1958 under Joseph Greenberg at Columbia University, which was published the following year under the title The Position of the Polynesian Languages within the Austronesian (Malayo-Polynesian) Language Family. After teaching at the Woman's College of the University of North Carolina (now, University of North Carolina at Greensboro) (1958–1959), at Northwestern University (1959–1960), and at Southern Illinois University (1960–1963), and serving as scholar in residence at the East-West Center in Honolulu (1964), he was hired by the newly formed Department of Linguistics at the University of Hawaii, where he has remained, apart from further fieldwork in New Caledonia (1970, 1971–1973) and New Guinea (1976).

Theoretical work

Apart from his research on Austronesian languages, Grace also worked on more theoretical questions close to philosophy of language
like the relationship between language and thought. 
In his book The Linguistic Construction of Reality, he discusses two opposed views of language that he claims are present in the linguistic research community of his time. 
What he means by "view" is a definition of language by linguists and also by society at large, what we think it is and how it works.
He introduces his own terminology and calls them the Mapping-view and the Reality-construction-view of language, with him being a proponent of the latter.  
Grace presumes that proponents of the Mapping-view think of different languages as dividing up the same objective world into different categories, 
quite like different political maps divide up the same territory in different ways.
The Reality-Construction-view on the other hand says that each language embodies a different conceptual construction of reality, 
which is a stronger claim than the Mapping-view's. 
One key difference between the two views is their attitude towards the postulate that "anything that can be said in one language can be said in any other language", 
which translates as the claim that translation from one language to another is always possible. 
According to Grace, the Mapping-view accepts this postulate, while the Reality-Construction-view rejects it. 
His unconventional terminology has been suggested as one reason why his theoretical work has received comparatively little attention in the scientific community.

Reality-Construction

As mentioned above, Grace was an advocate of what he called the Reality-Construction-view of language. 
He believed that through language, we construct our own, specific realities that we live in. 
This happens on two levels: First, an entire language contains a certain view of the world, which he calls a Conceptual World. 
Second, each time we say something we construct a certain Conceptual Event that reflects how we have chosen to characterize that which we want to talk about.
We do this by means of the lexical and grammatical resources a language provides.  
To put it in another way, he says that each language has a certain number of things that can be talked about, 
and certain ways of talking about these things that may not exist in other languages. 
His theory is substantially influenced by the writings of Benjamin Lee Whorf on linguistic relativity, Etienne Bonnet de Condillac and Wilhelm von Humboldt.

Selected publications

Notes

References

External links
University of Hawaii Department of Linguistics

1921 births
2015 deaths
Graduate Institute of International and Development Studies alumni
Linguists from the United States
Ethnolinguists
United States Army Air Forces soldiers
United States Army personnel of World War II
People from Corinth, Mississippi
Academics from Mississippi
Military personnel from Mississippi
Linguists of Austronesian languages
Historical linguists
Columbia University alumni
University of Hawaii faculty